{{DISPLAYTITLE:C22H27N3O2}}
The molecular formula C22H27N3O2 (molar mass: 365.46 g/mol) may refer to:

 ALD-52, a chemical analogue of LSD
 Caroverine, a psychoactive drug
 Nafadotride, a dopamine antagonist